East Rockaway is a village in Nassau County, on the South Shore of Long Island, in New York, United States. The population was 9,818 at the 2010 census.

The Incorporated Village of East Rockaway is at the edge of Rockaway Peninsula Proper in the town of Hempstead, adjacent to Hewlett Harbor, Hewlett, Rockville Centre, Lynbrook, and Oceanside. It is the final neighborhood before the beginning of Five Towns, although some have come to include wealthier sections of East Rockaway as a part of Five Towns. East Rockaway is an inner suburb, only 24 km (15 mi) from downtown Manhattan. The primary ethnicities are Italian and Irish. The Waverly Park neighborhood, near the Hewlett-East Rockaway Jewish Center  and along the border with Hewlett, has a sizable Jewish community.

History
Originally named Near Rockaway, the village began as a shipping and trading center for the South Shore of Long Island. The village's location was desirable for ships because of its deep channels inland. Eventually a grist mill was built on the Mill River by Joseph Haviland through a land grant in 1688. The Haviland-Davison Grist Mill, located in Memorial Park, was listed on the National Register of Historic Places in 1998. Later, an oven was purchased to make bread for the surrounding population. The village prospered in shipping and milling over the years, even after several sales of the land.

The village's name was changed in 1869 to East Rockaway.

The village was incorporated in 1900, and Floyd Johnson was president. 

At the time of incorporation the village had a population of 969.

Geography 

Demographics

As of the census of 2000, there were 10,414 people, 3,926 households, and 2,787 families residing in the village. The population density was 10,187.6 people per square mile (3,942.0/km2). There were 4,003 housing units at an average density of 3,916.0 per square mile (1,515.3/km2). The racial makeup of the village was 95.64% White, 0.61% African American, 0.03% Native American, 1.71% Asian, 0.01% Pacific Islander, 1.09% from other races, and 0.91% from two or more races. Hispanic or Latino of any race were 5.79% of the population.

There were 3,926 households, out of which 32.6% had children under the age of 18 living with them, 59.4% were married couples living together, 8.8% had a female householder with no husband present, and 29.0% were non-families. 25.9% of all households were made up of individuals, and 11.2% had someone living alone who was 65 years of age or older. The average household size was 2.62 and the average family size was 3.20.

In the village, the population was spread out, with 23.7% under the age of 18, 6.1% from 18 to 24, 30.6% from 25 to 44, 24.1% from 45 to 64, and 15.4% who were 65 years of age or older. The median age was 39 years. For every 100 females, there were 90.3 males. For every 100 females age 18 and over, there were 87.4 males.

The median income for a household in the village was $59,911, and the median income for a family was $78,363. Males had a median income of $50,365 versus $36,387 for females. The per capita income for the village was $30,601. About 2.4% of families and 3.5% of the population were below the poverty line, including 3.6% of those under age 18 and 6.0% of those age 65 or older.

Education

As of June 2022, there are two school districts serving East Rockaway: the East Rockaway School District and the Lynbrook Union Free School District:

There are three schools within the East Rockaway School District:
 Rhame Avenue Elementary School
 Centre Avenue (Elementary) School
 East Rockaway High School - Serves grades 7-12
Each grade of the high school consists of roughly 100 students. The nickname of the athletic teams is "The Rocks."  All high school varsity, jr. varsity and freshman team colors are a distinctive Orange and Black. East Rockaway High School fields competitive teams in football, cross country, volleyball, basketball, softball, baseball, and track. Along with these teams East Rockaway also combines with schools in the Malverne school district to form teams. These include soccer, lacrosse and tennis. School musicals and the inter-class competition known as "Rock Rivalry" are widely popular throughout the community.

Located in East Rockaway on Atlantic Avenue is St. Raymonds Catholic school, consisting of Pre-k through 8th grade. See Roman Catholic Diocese of Rockville Centre

The Waverly Park and Northwestern neighborhoods of East Rockaway (the border approximately running down Rocklyn, Carman, and Grant Avenues) are part of Lynbrook School District 20 in the Lynbrook Union Free School District, and are serviced by four main schools:
 Waverly Park Elementary School (in East Rockaway)
 Marion Street Elementary School (in East Rockaway)
 South Middle School (in Hewlett)
 Lynbrook Senior High School (in Lynbrook)

Parks and recreation
 John Street Complex — This recreational complex has one baseball diamond, two basketball courts, and a concession stand. Flag Football, Baseball, and Basketball are played at this complex.

Transportation
East Rockaway contains two Long Island Rail Road stations, both of which serve the Long Beach Branch. The main station between Ocean Avenue and Atlantic Avenue, and the Centre Avenue station northwest of there. Until 1951, there was also a third station at Atlantic Avenue.

Emergency services 
The village is primarily covered by the 4th Precinct of the Nassau County Police Department.

Fire and ambulance services are provided by the all volunteer East Rockaway Fire Department.

Notable people 
 Gary Giddins (1948- ), writer, Bing Crosby: A Pocketful of Dreams
 Reid Gorecki (1980-), Major League Baseball player
 Brian Keith (1921–1997), actor Family Affair
 Don Murray (1929- ), actor Bus Stop
 Bruce Sussman (1949-), Songwriter

References

External links
 
 Official website
 East Rockaway Fire Department
 East Rockaway Library
 East Rockaway School District
 East Rockaway Chamber of Commerce

Hempstead, New York
Villages in New York (state)
Villages in Nassau County, New York